Huron East was a federal electoral district represented in the House of Commons of Canada from 1882 to 1917. It was located in the province of Ontario. This riding was created from parts of Huron Centre, Huron North and Huron South ridings.

The East Riding of the county of Huron was initially defined to consist of the townships of Howick, Turnberry, Grey and Morris, the town of Wingham, and the villages of Brussels, Blyth and Wroxeter.

In 1903, it was expanded to include the township of Wawanosh East.

The electoral district was abolished in 1914 when it was merged into Huron North riding.

Election results

|}

|}

|}

|}

|}

|}

|}

|}

See also 
 List of Canadian federal electoral districts
 Past Canadian electoral districts

External links 
Riding history from the Library of Parliament

Former federal electoral districts of Ontario